Bjorn-Tore Larsen, Jr. (born September 25, 1979) is a retired American competitor in lightweight rowing. He won a silver medal in the coxless fours at the 2007 Pan American Games.

References

1979 births
Living people
American male rowers
Pan American Games medalists in rowing
Pan American Games silver medalists for the United States
Rowers at the 2007 Pan American Games
Medalists at the 2007 Pan American Games